Niklas Wilson Sommer (born 2 April 1998) is a German professional footballer who plays as a right-back for Waldhof Mannheim.

Club career
Sommer made his professional debut for Sonnenhof Großaspach in the 3. Liga on 16 March 2019, starting in the away match against SpVgg Unterhaching before being substituted out in the 80th minute for Jonas Meiser, with the match finishing as a 0–0 draw.

International career
Sommer was born in Germany to an Angolan father and German mother. He is a youth international for Germany, having represented the Germany U16s.

References

External links
 
 
 

1998 births
Living people
People from Dessau-Roßlau
Footballers from Saxony-Anhalt
German footballers
Germany youth international footballers
German people of Angolan descent
Association football fullbacks
1. FC Nürnberg II players
VfB Stuttgart II players
SG Sonnenhof Großaspach players
FC DAC 1904 Dunajská Streda players
SV Waldhof Mannheim players
3. Liga players
Regionalliga players
Slovak Super Liga players
German expatriate footballers
German expatriate sportspeople in Slovakia
Expatriate footballers in Slovakia